Kerala Institute of Local Administration, abbreviated as KILA, is an autonomous training, research and consultancy organisation constituted under the Ministry of Local Self Government, Government of Kerala, registered as per Travancore – Cochin Literacy, Scientific and Charitable Societies Act-1955. KILA was established in 1990, in the pattern of a national institute, with the main objective of strengthening decentralization and local governance.

Objectives

The exact objectives, included in the Memorandum of Association and Rules  of the Institute issued as a Government Order (MS) No 139/90/LAD dated 13 September 1990, are as follows:-
 to undertake the organisation of training and study courses, conferences, workshops, seminars etc. for the functionaries of the Panchayat Department and the local bodies, non-officials such as Members of Legislative Assembly, Members of Parliament, Panchayat Presidents and other non-officials concerned with administration of local bodies.
 to promote  research through its own or through other agencies.
 to establish centres for training, instruction, and research.
 to propose solutions of problems encountered in the implementation of programs of panchayats and other local bodies.
 to act as an advisory agency to the State Government in the area of Panchayati Raj and local administration,
 to establish and maintain libraries and information services.
 to collaborate with other institutions, associations and societies in India and abroad interested in similar objects
 to offer fellowships, scholarships, and prizes in furtherance of the objects of the society.

Physical facilities
KILA is situated on an eight hectare green campus.

Facilities include two fully furnished guest houses which can accommodate 200 participants at a time, an auditorium with 500 seating capacity, a seminar hall for 100 persons, a conference room for 30 participants, five training halls altogether accommodate 200 participants, and one computer center with 20 computers. Two dining halls that can accommodate 200 persons at a time are on campus.

KILA office has a local area network for its administration, internet connection, printers and all accessories essential for a training institute.

Organisational pattern
KILA was established in the pattern of a national institute with the main objective of training, research and consultancy in decentralised governance and administration. KILA was registered as an autonomous institution under the Travancore-Cochin Literary, Scientific and Charitable Societies Act 1955. KILA is the only institution in India that functions with the sole mandate of promoting decentralised governance both in urban and rural areas. As a result of this, efforts are on to establish KILA as an international training centre on local governance and declare KILA as the SAARC centre of excellence in local governance. Dr Joy Elamon, eminent public health expert and international development consultant is currently heading KILA.

Overview of activities
KILA has been engaged in the capacity building activities for local governments in Kerala since its establishment in 1990.The institute is supported by the government of Kerala as its  institution for training, research and consultancy for the local self-government institutions.

Training is a dominant activity of KILA, with an out turn of around one lakh trained manpower in Kerala. The institute has conducted research studies and brought out reports and working papers.

The majority of the training programmes are of short duration ranging from one day to five days at a stretch. But some training programmes stretch for a month. A Certificate Course on Panchayati Raj was a one-month-long programme for elected representatives.

Training programmes
The training programmes offered by KILA  are:

 Trainers Training Programme
 Panchayat to Panchayt Programme
 Certificate Course for Elected Representatives
 national Level Course on Decentralised Governance
 International Course on Decentralisation
 Off-Campus Training Programme
 Decentralised Training for Local Government Functionaries

 The chart on the right side of this page shows the growth of training programmes conducted in the institute.

Publications
 
The institute disseminates the research and recommendations of its training programmes and workshops through publications. In order to meet the training needs of the participants from other Indian states and neighbouring countries KILA has translated documents into English and other Indian languages like Hindi, Tamil, Bengali and Kannada.

A list of publications is available at the publication page of  KILA website

Library and information services

KILA Library and Information Division is the centre for collection, organization and dissemination of information on decentralisation and local governance.

KILA Library holds books, reports, journals and other documents in print or digital form. It creates and distributes a few cd-rom publications and offers a phone-in-service on local governance. The division promotes digital archiving technologies in sectors closely related to local governance and has evolved a methodology for digital archiving using free software Winisis, Genesis and Greenstone.

The Library & Information Division has brought out documents for promoting the use of information technologies to support local governance in Kerala, as part of its library extension services.

CD-ROM publications
KILA has created/collected digital documents, organising them as searchable archives and distributing them as digital collections/CD-ROM libraries in subject areas related to decentralisation.

The two CD-ROM publications prominent among them are:-
 CD-ROM entitled E-Documents on Decentralisation in Kerala consisting of digital documents relating to Kerala decentralization
 CD-ROM archive entitled CD-ROM Library on Local Governance consisting of around 1200 pieces of digital documents collected from the Internet and elsewhere

More than two dozen CD-ROM libraries containing around 5000 digital documents are distributed as part of the library services on no-profit basis. Most prominent among them is Community Development Library containing 1785 documents of around 1.6 lakh pages.
Manual on Digital Document Archiving is a publication of KILA intended to promote the concept of digital document archiving using free software tools promoted by Unesco.

International collaboration
KILA collaborates with national and international agencies like Swiss Agency for Development and Co-operation (SDC), United Nations Development Programme (UNDP), UN-HABITAT, and Housing and Urban Development Corporation (HUDCO) with a motive of deepening local governance. KILA collaborates with the Sri Lanka Institute of Local Governance and All India Institute of Local Self Governments, Mumbai to conduct international course in decentralised governance and poverty alleviation.

References

Further reading
 Kerala Institute of Local Administration: Service bye-laws
 Annual Report of Kerala Institute of Local Administration

External links

 Official website of KILA
 Official website of Local Self Government Department, government of Kerla

State agencies of Kerala
Government of Thrissur
Local government in Kerala
Organisations based in Thrissur
1990 establishments in Kerala